Mark Andrew Pears  (born 1962) is a British billionaire businessman, CEO of the privately held William Pears Group since 1984.

Early life
Mark Andrew Pears was born in 1962, the son of Clive Pears (died 1984) and Clarice Talisman Castle (1933–1999), and the grandson of Bernard Pears. Clarice Talisman Castle was born in and grew up in Lochside Street, Shawlands, Glasgow, the daughter of Abraham Castle, a dealer in electrical and wireless appliances, and his wife Hannah.

He grew up in Hendon and was educated at the City of London School.

Career
The William Pears Group was founded in 1952, by his grandfather Bernard Pears (who changed his name from Schleicher in 1939) and his father Clive Pears, and is run by Mark Pears with his younger brothers Trevor and David.

Mark Pears has run the company since his father died in 1984, when he was aged 21.

According to The Daily Telegraph, Pears won't allow his photo to be taken, or say which of the over 212 companies of which he is a director, a "complex labyrinth of operating and investment companies", is the main holding company or what the group's annual profit might be.

In 2014, he had a net worth of £2.1 billion.

Philanthropy
In 1992, he co-founded the Pears Foundation, together with his brothers.

Personal life
In 1987, he married Debra Groves at the Western Marble Arch Synagogue. They live in Totteridge, London.

Honours
He was awarded a CBE in the 2014 Queen's Birthday Honours, "For services to Business and to Charity".

References

1962 births
Living people
British billionaires
People educated at the City of London School
British Jews
Commanders of the Order of the British Empire
Pears family